Ōmiha is a rural settlement on the southwest coast of Waiheke Island in the Auckland Region of New Zealand. The settlement began when the O'Brien brothers subdivided their farm in 1922, naming it "Omiha Beach Estate". The area is also known as Rocky Bay from the bay to the south. A proposal that the name change to Rocky Bay in 2017 met strong opposition and was rejected. The name Ōmiha, with the macron, became official in 2018.

Demographics

Ōmiha had a population of 492 at the 2018 New Zealand census, an increase of 108 people (28.1%) since the 2013 census, and an increase of 150 people (43.9%) since the 2006 census. There were 207 households, comprising 225 males and 261 females, giving a sex ratio of 0.86 males per female, with 72 people (14.6%) aged under 15 years, 60 (12.2%) aged 15 to 29, 243 (49.4%) aged 30 to 64, and 114 (23.2%) aged 65 or older.

Ethnicities were 88.4% European/Pākehā, 11.6% Māori, 9.1% Pacific peoples, 3.7% Asian, and 3.7% other ethnicities. People may identify with more than one ethnicity.

Although some people chose not to answer the census's question about religious affiliation, 65.9% had no religion, 20.1% were Christian, 0.6% were Hindu, 1.2% were Buddhist and 2.4% had other religions.

Of those at least 15 years old, 144 (34.3%) people had a bachelor's or higher degree, and 63 (15.0%) people had no formal qualifications. 75 people (17.9%) earned over $70,000 compared to 17.2% nationally. The employment status of those at least 15 was that 180 (42.9%) people were employed full-time, 63 (15.0%) were part-time, and 6 (1.4%) were unemployed.

Notes

Populated places on Waiheke Island